Mar Thomas Elavanal (born 28 March 1950) is a Syro Malabar Catholic Bishop. He is the Bishop of the Diocese of Kalyan.

Biography 

Bishop Mar Thomas Elavanal was born in  Elevanal family a branch of ancient Palackal family of Pallipuram to Zacharias and Thresia on 28 March 1950 at Mutholy, near Palai, in Kerala. But his stay at Palai was to be very short as the family migrated to Chathankottunada, near Kuttiady in Calicut district, where he completed his high school education. He then joined, or we can say with a spiritual meaning, migrated to the MCBS Minor Seminary in June 1966 and had his first religious profession on 17 May 1968 and priestly ordination by Mar Sebastian Mankuzhikary on 22 December 1975. After a brief period of 3 years appointment at the MCBS Minor Seminary, Kottayam, he once again "migrated" for his Higher Studies, first to Rome and then to the US. He holds a licentiate in liturgy from Pontifical Oriental Institute and a doctorate in theology from the Pontifical University of St. Thomas Aquinas, Angelicum in Rome.  His dissertation was entitled A study of the anaphora of the Apostles Mar Addai and Mari. He had his post-doctoral courses in the Catholic University of America, Washington. At his return, he was appointed rector of the MCBS Seminary, Alwaye and in 1989, the assistant superior general of the congregation, at the age of 39. He was the visiting professor of liturgy at the Pontifical Institute of Theology and Philosophy, Alwaye and Paurastya Vidyapitham, Kottayam. In 1995 he was elected the superior general. But as providence may have it, on 18 December 1996 he was nominated bishop of Kalyan. On 8 February 1997, he was consecrated bishop, the shepherd of over one hundred thousand migrants of the Syro-Malabar Catholics spread over in the big cities of Bombay, Pune and Nashik. He is the Chairman of Western Regional Commission for Health and a member of Syro-Malabar Synodal Commission for Liturgy.

References

External links

 Profile from Syro Malabar Church Website
 Profile from Catholic Hierarchy

1950 births
Syro-Malabar bishops
Living people
People from Pala, Kerala